The uninhabited Arvalik Islands are part of the Qikiqtaaluk Region, in the Canadian territory of Nunavut. They are located in southeastern Ungava Bay, southwest of the Inuit hamlet of Kangiqsualujjuaq, Quebec and north of Imirqutailaisitik Island.

References

External links 
 Arvalik Islands in the Atlas of Canada - Toporama; Natural Resources Canada

Uninhabited islands of Qikiqtaaluk Region